Leinster Lightning was formed in 2013 and became a List A team in 2017. They played their inaugural List A match in the 2017 Inter-Provincial Cup against North West Warriors. Leinster Lightning have won the Interprovincial Cup five times in a row, twice with List A status. In total, 26 players have appeared in List A cricket for Leinster Lightning, with three players having played in all 22 List A fixtures played by Leinster Lightning to date.

George Dockrell is Leinster Lightning's leading run-scorer in List A cricket, aggregating 709 runs. Five batsmen have scored a century for Leinster Lightning in the format: Ed Joyce, Simi Singh, Andrew Balbirnie, Jack Tector and Dockrell. Balbirnie's score of 126 is the highest score by a Leinster Lightning batsman, while Dockrell has the teams best batting average: 101.28. Among the bowlers, Dockrell has taken more wickets than any other, claiming 35 – nine wickets more than that of the second most prolific bowler Singh. Barry McCarthy has the best bowling figures in an innings: he claimed six wickets, while conceding 39 runs. Lorcan Tucker has kept wicket in 21 of Leinster Lightning's 22 List A matches, taking 33 catches and effecting 7 stumpings.

Players are initially listed in order of appearance; where players made their debut in the same match, they are initially listed by batting order.

Key

List of List A cricketers

See also
List of Leinster Lightning first-class players
List of Leinster Lightning Twenty20 players

References

Leinster Lightning
Cricketers, List A